Polygamy is legal under certain circumstances in South Africa. All polygamous marriages entered into in accordance with the provisions of the Recognition of Customary Marriages Act are legal. The husband in an existing customary marriage wishing to marry a second wife must apply to a competent court for such a marriage to be legal. Hence former President Jacob Zuma currently has four legally-recognised wives. The court considers the interests of all parties to the marriage and may add whatever conditions the court deems just for the polygamous marriage to be valid under customary law. Polygamous marriages are not allowed under the Marriage Act and the Civil Unions Act.

A person married under the Civil Union Act which allows same-sex couples to marry, may not enter into marriage with a second partner until the existing marriage is dissolved. Therefore only men are allowed to marry more than one spouse of the opposite sex at the same time. 

South African traditionalists have been well known to practice polygamy and the topic has been a serious political issue in the past several years, especially in the 2009 elections. Many of the indigenous Bantu peoples, both Christians and Indigenous, are polygamous. Islamic South Africans such as are found among the Cape Malays, Cape Coloureds, and Indian South Africans also allow for polygamy.

Jacob Zuma, the former president of South Africa, is a self-proclaimed polygamist. He has been married five times, and is currently married to four different women. He has reportedly fathered 20 children among his wives and mistresses.

References 

South Africa
South African culture
Marriage, unions and partnerships in South Africa